Farini (Piacentino:  or ) is a comune (municipality) in the Province of Piacenza in the Italian region Emilia-Romagna, located about  west of Bologna and about  southwest of Piacenza.
In September 2015, Farini suffered a major flood due to heavy rain.

Farini borders the following municipalities: Bardi, Bettola, Coli, Ferriere, Morfasso.

Demographic evolution

Twin towns
Farini is twinned with:

  Nogent-sur-Marne, France, since 1983

References

Cities and towns in Emilia-Romagna